Matina is a district of the Matina canton, in the Limón province of Costa Rica.

History
In 1747 the main fort (Fuerte de San Fernando de Matina) was captured by British Baymen and Miskito Sambus from the Mosquito Coast - the Cacao rich area was subsequently ravaged.  Matina was created on 24 June 1969 by Ley 4344.

Geography

Demographics
For the 2011 census, Matina had a population of 9142 inhabitants.

References

districts of Limón Province
populated places in Limón Province